Loch an t-Sailein is a sea loch at the southeast coast of Islay, Scotland. European seals frequently visit the shallow waters of this loch. A number of bird species are found along the shores of Loch an t-Sailein. The southeast coast of Islay has a highly irregular shoreline with many lochs and bays including Aros Bay somewhat to the east.

See also
 Ardbeg, Islay

Footnotes

Landforms of Islay
Lochs of Argyll and Bute
Sea lochs of Scotland